The NWA New England Colonial Championship was a short-lived secondary singles wrestling title in the NWA New England. It was first won by Gino Martino, who was awarded the title after winning the annual Tony Rumble Memorial Battle Royal in Bellingham, Massachusetts on November 20, 2004. The title was co-promoted with a local promotion, New World Wrestling, and defended in both promotions during an eight-month period before being merged with the NWW Heavyweight Championship in August 2005.

Title history
Silver areas in the history indicate periods of unknown lineage.

References

National Wrestling Alliance championships
Regional professional wrestling championships